People's Progressive Movement can refer to:

People's Progressive Movement (Barbados)
People's Progressive Movement (Cayman Islands)
People's Progressive Movement (Malawi)
People's Progressive Movement (Saint Vincent and the Grenadines)